The Great Southern and Western Railway (GS&WR) Class 362, also known as class B3, consisted of six locomotives designed by Robert Coey and built between 1905 and 1907 for goods traffic and was the first tender locomotive to utilise the  wheel arrangement in Ireland.

History
The class was designed to be more powerful than his preceding class 355 .  It was the first mainline use of the  wheel arrangement in Ireland, and  an axle loading of under .

Chas. S. Lake, in his book Locomotives of 1906 illustrated the type as en example of the  becoming considered for other than express passenger usage, the Class 362 with its  driving wheels optimised for freight work. The GS&WR selected engine 366 to be displayed at the 1907 Dublin Exhibition.

While the designed increase in power was achieved the type did have some operational issues, these included being too long for some turntables, a tendency for rough riding at speed and incidents of derailment due to lack of weight on the forward bogie.  The class did not compare favourably with class 355 when the former were converted to the 2-6-0 wheel arrangement and were withdrawn by 1931.

There is a detailed O Gauge model of engine 362 in the Fry model railway collection.

References

Notelist

Footnotes

Sources

Further reading
 

4-6-0 locomotives
5 ft 3 in gauge locomotives
Railway locomotives introduced in 1905
Scrapped locomotives
Steam locomotives of Ireland